Lorenzo D. "Larry" Bevan (December 13, 1889 – January 10, 1930) was an American football player and coach. He served as the head football coach at Ohio Northern University in Ada, Ohio from 1916 to 1917, compiling a record of 6–11. Bevan was also the head basketball coach at Ohio Northern for two seasons, in 1916–17 and 1919–20. He played Minor League Baseball for one season, in 1907.

Bevan died on January 10, 1930, at Henry Ford Hospital in  Detroit, Michigan. He was the brother of another college football and basketball coach, Roland Bevan.

Head coaching record

College football

References

External link
 
 

1889 births
1930 deaths
Basketball coaches from Ohio
Marietta Pioneers football players
McKeesport Tubers players
Ohio Northern Polar Bears football coaches
Ohio Northern Polar Bears men's basketball coaches
High school football coaches in Ohio
Ohio Northern University alumni
People from Warren County, Ohio
Players of American football from Ohio